Minzu railway station can refer to the following stations:
Minzu railway station (Taiwan)
Minzu railway station (Inner Mongolia)